The Women's 5000 metres competition at the 2020 World Single Distances Speed Skating Championships was held on February 15, 2020.

Results
The race was started at 12:30.

References

Women's 5000 metres